Diethyl sulfoxide, C4H10OS, is a sulfur-containing organic compound.

References

Sulfoxides